William Benbow Humphreys (1889-1965), City Councillor in Kimberley, Member of the Cape Provincial Council, and Member of Parliament (for Beaconsfield and afterwards for Kimberley), was the founder of the William Humphreys Art Gallery in Kimberley. He became, in 1961, the second recipient of the Freedom of the City of Kimberley. Humphreys was born in Oudtshoorn on 5 April 1889 and died in Kimberley on 25 July 1965.

Early life

While born in Oudtshoorn, Humphreys’ lifelong association with Kimberley originated when, aged just 6 months, he went with his family to that town (later to become a city). He was educated at Kimberley Boys' High School, matriculating there in 1908.

Humphreys afterwards graduated from the Elsenburg Agricultural Training Institute, Stellenbosch, and subsequently pursued farming interests in the Campbell district west of Kimberley. Humphreys also worked with his father, S.B. Humphreys, who was a general dealer and produce merchant in Giddy Street, Kimberley.

In 1910 he had married Maude Elizabeth Searle, born in 1890 at Blanco near George, but who, like Humphreys himself, had gone to Kimberley at a young age. She bore him six children: Dulcie, Aubrey, Basil, Margery, Elaine and Winsome.

Political career

Humphreys’ political career commenced with his election to the Kimberley City Council in 1917, and was advanced a decade later in his becoming a Member of the Cape Provincial Council. In that same year, 1927, he retired from the family business to further his political interests. Two years later he was elected to the Union Parliament as the representative for Beaconsfield, one of the Kimberley constituencies, following the retirement of Sir David Harris.

In 1933 he was returned to the Beaconsfield seat unopposed, as the coalition candidate of the South African Party. His proficiency in both English and Afrikaans was a distinct advantage in a constituency that had significant urban and rural components, English-speakers predominating in the former area and Afrikaans-speakers in the latter.

Upon Sir Ernest Oppenheimer's retirement from Parliament as Kimberley's representative in 1938, Humphreys took over that seat. In 1948 he retired from politics, never having lost an election in the 19 years he was actively involved in it.

Vaalharts Irrigation Scheme

In 1933 Humphreys had been instrumental in having Government embark on the building of the Vaalharts Irrigation Scheme, one of the world's largest irrigation schemes, extending over an area of 369.50 square kilometres The four million Pound project brought relief to severe unemployment during the Great Depression, and has turned the area into one of South Africa's major agricultural regions. At a meeting at the Kimberley City Hall on 2 November 1933 Colonel Deneys Reitz, Minister of Lands and Irrigation, paid tribute to Humphreys for his efforts towards the realisation of the scheme.

Art collector and the founding of the William Humphreys Art Gallery

Beyond Parliament, Humphreys pursued other interests. He sat on the Kimberley School Board, for instance, from 1921 to 1930. At a personal level he continued with farming, raising purebred Persian sheep, devoting more time to this following his retirement from politics.

Above all, however, his interest in art took up his time, resulting in a burgeoning collection, augmented during frequent trips to Europe when he bought paintings, sculpture, old furniture and objets d'art. His home, Benbow Lodge at 46 Carrington Road Kimberley, including a purpose-built gallery, was filled with these treasures, of which a sizeable proportion were of the Dutch and Flemish schools of the 17th century.

In 1948 Humphreys donated a part of his vast collection to the people of Kimberley and the Northern Cape “in consideration of his long association with the public life of the northern Cape and his desire to further the interests of the said region.” This collection, known as Humphreys’ Bequest, comprising a selection of European and British paintings, furniture and contemporary copies of classical sculptures, was initially housed at the Northern Cape Technical College. 
The terms of the donation stipulated that a suitable gallery should be built as a more permanent home for the collection, with Humphreys additionally giving a  large grant towards the building costs.

On 5 June 1952 Humphreys laid the foundation stone of the Gallery which today bears his name. Six months later the Gallery was officially opened by Mr Harry Oppenheimer. Humphreys served as curator, secretary, caretaker and virtually everything else during the early years of the Gallery's history.

His contribution was recognised and acknowledged on 5 April 1960, Humphreys' 71st birthday, at a special function held in the Art Gallery when Kimberley Mayor, Mr l Jawno, said "there is no better name for this wonderful showplace."

Freedom of the City of Kimberley

The following year Humphreys had conferred upon him Freedom of the City in acknowledgement of all he had done for Kimberley and the Northern Cape, in many spheres, ranging from politics to the arts. The ceremony took place in the Council Chamber on 14 September 1961. Mr Graham Eden said that were it not for Humphreys' efforts, "the aspirations of this vast area of the northern Cape would never have seen the light of day in Parliament."

Civic funeral

Following his death on 25 July 1965, a civic funeral took place at the Newton Dutch Reformed Church. The Humphreys family had had a close connection to it, William Humphreys' mother having given the four-face clock and bells in the tower. Humphreys had himself given a set of collection plates. The service was conducted by the Revd W Fullard. Leader of the Indian community, Mr G.W. Naidoo recalled that Mr Humphreys "was one who was quick to appreciate other people's hardships (and worked for the interests of the Coloured and Indian people of the city). He loved the poor and served his people with an understanding heart."

References

People from Kimberley, Northern Cape
South African art collectors
1965 deaths
1889 births